Antonia Wilma Alanoca Mamani (born 5 July 1978) is a Bolivian journalist, politician, and television presenter who served as minister of cultures and tourism from 2017 to 2019. A member of the Movement for Socialism, she previously served an El Alto municipal councilor from 2015 to 2017, a position she returned to in 2021.

Biography

Early years
Wilma Alanoca was born on 5 July 1978 in La Paz, the youngest of four children of neighborhood leader Rosendo Alanoca and merchant Margarita Mamani.

She began her primary studies in La Paz in 1984. In 1990, when she was 12 years old, the Alanoca family moved to the city of El Alto. She continued her studies there, leaving high school in 1996.

She studied social communication at the Higher University of San Andrés (UMSA), graduating as a journalist in 2009.

Professional career
Alanoca began her career in media in 2004, while still a university student, appearing on the Continental Radio program Compartiendo la tarde (Sharing the Afternoon). She was also on the state channel Bolivia TV with a small business program called Pymes y Mypes. Alanoca worked as a radio broadcaster on Radio Integración in El Alto, with her program Dos horas con Wilma (Two Hours with Wilma), as well as on El Alto's regional Canal 24 with the program Wilma y Usted (Wilma and You). She also became the communications director of the  company, although only for a short time.

Red ATB (2011–2014)
In 2011, Alanoca joined Red ATB, where she initially covered the news from El Alto, and then as a news anchor. She worked at this media outlet until 2014.

Political career

Councilor of El Alto (2015–2017)
In 2015, Alanoca declared herself a candidate of the MAS-IPSP led by Evo Morales. In March 2015, she was elected councilor in the opposition in the city of El Alto. She was a member of the council from 2015 to 2017.

Minister of Cultures of Bolivia (2017–2019)
On 23 January 2017, President Evo Morales appointed Alanoca Minister of Cultures of Bolivia. Along with Mariana Prado (born 1982) and Ariana Campero (born 1986), she was one of the three youngest ministers of the third government of President Morales, who made an effort to renew his cabinet with the inclusion of new generations.

Return to politics 
On 29 December 2020, it was announced that Alanoca would seek to be elected to her former position of Councilor of El Alto as the MAS candidate for the 2021 Bolivian regional elections. However, her candidacy was challenged the day after by incumbent councilor Javier Tarqui on the grounds that she did not meet the residence requirements to run. This is due to the fact that in order to run, candidates must have resided permanently for at least the two years immediately prior to the election in the corresponding jurisdiction. Tarqui posited that since Alanoca had been living in asylum for almost a year in the Mexican Embassy in La Paz which "for international standards […] is constituted in Mexican territory, under Mexican sovereignty" she therefore had not been living in Bolivian territory for the mandated two years. Alanoca's candidacy was also challenged by members of MAS itself who did not want to run a former minister when, while she was in asylum, there were other people who had resisted the transitional government in El Alto.

Controversies
On 1 March 2018, during the delivery of household gas in El Alto on the occasion of her anniversary, Minister Alanoca was verbally assaulted by President Morales. He was harshly criticized by the population for denigrating women with the following phrase:

References

External links
 

1978 births
Living people
21st-century Bolivian politicians
21st-century Bolivian women politicians
Bolivian journalists
Bolivian women journalists
Evo Morales administration cabinet members
Culture ministers of Bolivia
Higher University of San Andrés alumni
People from La Paz
Women government ministers of Bolivia